The Robert Bresson Prize is a recognition offered during the Venice Film Festival to the director who, according to the Pontifical Councils for Culture and for Social Communications of the Vatican, "has given a testimony, significant for sincerity and intensity, of the difficult passage in search of spiritual meaning in our lives".

In 2010, on the occasion of the 11th edition of the Prize, a special piece of art has been realized. The title of the work is "HOPE" and was made by the artist Akelo (Andrea Cagnetti).

Previous editions
 2000 – Giuseppe Tornatore
 2001 – Manoel de Oliveira
 2002 – Theo Angelopoulos
 2003 – Krzysztof Zanussi
 2004 – Wim Wenders
 2005 – Jerzy Stuhr
 2006 – Zhang Yuan
 2007 – Alexander Sokurov
 2008 – Daniel Burman
 2009 – Walter Salles
 2010 – Mahamat Saleh Haroun
 2011 – Dardenne brothers
 2012 – Ken Loach
 2013 – Amos Gitai
 2014 – Carlo Verdone
 2015 – Mohsen Makhmalbaf

External links
 

Robert Bresson
Venice Film Festival